Cranston O’Neal Wilder (born August 9, 1989) is an American sprinter who specializes in the 400 metres. He currently in his junior year at Mississippi State University.

At the 2008 World Junior Championships in Athletics held in Bydgoszcz, Poland, Wilder won a bronze medal in the 400 metres, and also helped the U.S. squad to a gold medal in the 4×400 metres relay.

Personal best

References

External links

Mississippi State Bulldogs bio

1989 births
Living people
American male sprinters
Mississippi State Bulldogs men's track and field athletes
People from Carthage, Mississippi